The Divertimento No. 15 in B-flat major, K. 287, is a divertimento for two horns and strings by Wolfgang Amadeus Mozart. He composed the work in six movements in 1777 for the name day of Countess Maria Antonia Lodron. It is also known as the Lodronische Nachtmusik Nr. 2.

History 
Mozart composed the divertimento in 1777 for the name day of Countess Maria Antonia Lodron, a family friend and member of the Salzburg aristocracy. It was first performed  on 13 June 1777 at an informal outdoor party.

Instrumentation 
This divertimento is scored for two horns and strings.

Movements 
The divertimento is structured in six movements: 
 Allegro (in B-flat major and in sonata form)
 Tema con variazioni (Andante) (theme and 6 variations, where the theme and all the variations are in F major)
 Menuetto - Trio (in B-flat major and in ternary form, trio in G minor)
 Adagio (in E-flat major and in sonata form)
 Menuetto - Trio (in B-flat major and in ternary form, trio in E-flat major)
 Andante - Allegro molto (in B-flat major, beginning with an introductory instrumental recitative, and in sonata rondo form)

References

External links 
 

Divertimento No. 15
Compositions in B-flat major
1777 compositions